Cécile Cukierman (born 26 April 1976) is a French politician. She serves as a Communist Senator for the Loire.

Biography

Early life
Cécile Cukierman was born on 26 April 1976.

Career
She works as a teacher of history and geography.

She serves as Deputy Mayor of Unieux. She has also been a member of the regional council of Rhône-Alpes since 2004. Additionally, she was elected to the French Senate on 25 September 2011, where she serves on the Commission on Culture, Education and Communication.

Personal life
She is married, and has three children.

References

1976 births
Living people
French Communist Party politicians
French Senators of the Fifth Republic
People from Hauts-de-Seine
Women members of the Senate (France)
21st-century French women politicians
Senators of Loire (department)
Regional councillors of Auvergne-Rhône-Alpes